The Thane Municipal Corporation Transport Service, operating under the name "Thane Municipal Transport (T.M.T.)" is the transport wing of Thane Municipal Corporation, which operates many bus lines in the Thane metropolitan area. These buses are called Thane Municipal Transport or T.M.T bus. TMT bus serves the entire Thane City. It also has operation outside city limits into neighboring Mumbai, Bhiwandi, Navi Mumbai, Kalyan Dombivali, Mira-Bhayandar and Vasai Virar.

History 

Thane Municipal Corporation started its own transport service on 9 February 1989, known as TMT. TMT is the major bus service provider in Thane. TMT has all its bus depots in Thane and numerous bus stops. The biggest depot is at Wagle Estate.TMT plies its buses inside Thane city and also towards Kalwa & Mumbra. TMT bus ply from Thane to Bhiwandi, Mira Road, Mulund, Borivali, Andheri, Nallasopara, BKC and Dombivali.
Mumbai Circle Central Place Is Thane . Most Crowded Station, Bus Stop, Roads.

See also
 Transportation in Thane
 BEST Bus
 Navi Mumbai Municipal Transport (NMMT)
 Vasai-Virar Municipal Transport (VVMT)
 Mira-Bhayandar Municipal Transport
 KDMT
 Thane
 Patlipada
 Kolshet

References

Transport in Thane
Municipal transport agencies of India
1989 establishments in Maharashtra
Transport companies established in 1989
Indian companies established in 1989
Companies based in Maharashtra